Narbuvoll is a village in Os Municipality in Innlandet county, Norway. The large mountain Håmmålsfjellet lies between the villages of Narbuvoll and Os i Østerdalen. The Tufsingdalen valley lies to the southeast of Narbuvoll.

Narbuvoll Church is located in the village.

History
During the 1600s, the area was used for forestry, with a lot of the trees being cut down to be used at the smelter in Tolga, so by the early 1700s, the area was cleared with few forests remaining. Today's village area was first settled in 1732 when two married couples moved to the area to start a farm. They were from Vingelen in Tolga. Historically, the people of Vingelen had farming and fishing rights to the areas around the lake Narsjøen, but no one lived there year-round. At its peak, there were 10 farms operating in the village, but that has since declined.

References

Os, Innlandet
Villages in Innlandet